The Austrian resistance launched in response to the rise of the fascists across Europe and, more specifically, to the Anschluss in 1938 and resulting occupation of Austria by Germany.

An estimated 100,000 people were reported to have participated in this resistance with thousands subsequently imprisoned or executed for their anti-Nazi activities. The main cipher of the Austrian resistance was O5, in which "O" indicates the first letter of the abbreviation of Österreich (OE), with the "5" indicating the fifth letter of the German alphabet (E). This sign may be seen at the Stephansdom in Vienna.

The Moscow Declarations of 1943 laid a framework for the establishment of a free Austria after the victory over Nazi Germany. It stated that "Austria is reminded, however that she has a responsibility, which she cannot evade, for participation in the war on the side of Hitlerite Germany, and that in the final settlement account will inevitably be taken of her own contribution to her liberation."

Overview 

The Austrian resistance groups were often ideologically separated and reflected the spectrum of political parties before the war.

The most spectacular individual but tiny group of the Austrian resistance was the one around the priest Heinrich Maier. On the one hand, this very successful Catholic resistance group wanted to revive a Habsburg monarchy after the war and very successfully passed on plans and production facilities for V-1, V-2 rockets, Tiger tanks and aircraft (Messerschmitt Bf 109, Messerschmitt Me 163 Komet, etc.) to the Allies. The resistance group, later uncovered by the Gestapo, was in contact with Allen Dulles, the head of the US OSS in Switzerland. With the location sketches of the production facilities, the Allied bombers were able to carry out precise air strikes and thus protect residential areas. The information was important to Operation Crossbow and Operation Hydra, both preliminary missions for Operation Overlord. In contrast to many other German resistance groups, the Maier group informed very early about the mass murder of Jews through its contacts with the Semperit factory near Auschwitz.

In addition to armed resistance efforts, "silent heroes" helped Jewish men, women and children evade persecution by Nazi authorities by hiding at-risk individuals at their homes or in other safe houses, storing or exchanging their property to raise funds to support them, and/or helping them to flee the country. Each of these resistance members lived dangerously because such assistance to the Jewish community was punishable by imprisonment at concentration camps and, ultimately, by death. Among these "silent heroes" were Rosa Stallbaumer and her husband, Anton. Arrested by the Gestapo in 1942, they were both sent to the Dachau concentration camp in Germany. Although Anton survived, Rosa Stallbaumer did not; transferred to Auschwitz, she died there a week before her 45th birthday.

Austrian resistance organizations and groups 

Armed groups: Carinthian Slovenes as partisans of Carinthia (see Yugoslav partisans) and the partisan ; the groups often referred to partisans in the Salzkammergut (group "Willy Fred") or in the Ötztal. Around 50 people belonged to this group. Apart from their political activity, in the beginning they did not go beyond the construction and arming phase.
Their activities extended from 1944 to Western Styria. They began to attack in the districts of Leibnitz and Deutschlandsberg (Styria) infrastructure facilities such as municipal offices and gendarmerie. They also sabotaged militarily important facilities such as bridges and railways.
Also in Styria, in the area around the Erzberg, in the area of Ennstal, there were different resistance groups. The aim of the actions was mainly the paralyzing of rail transport and the front replenishment. The communist group centered around the miners Martin Michelli, Johann Pech, Siegfried Pichler and Alexander Soukup planned, among other things, the demolition of bridges of Erzbergbahn, but was arrested by the Gestapo in late 1941 and the members largely sentenced to death.
The so-called Salzkammergut partisans under the direction of the im August 1943 fled from the concentration camp Hallein communist Spain fighter Sepp Plieseis hid in a hideout ("hedgehog"/"Igel") at the "Ischler Hütte" (Ischler cottage) in the Totes Gebirge and maintained close contact with resistance circles in the area. The difficult and dangerous supply was done by dedicated women from the valley. In fact, in order to avoid reprisals against the civilian population, the group did not have an armed man, combat taken or violent actions set. Karl Feldhammer from Bad Aussee was, however, in the course of his arrest by the Gestapo Linz shot on January 26, 1945. His wife was Marianne "Mariandl" Feldhammer. In the Salzkammergut from the end of April 1945 also acted from the British SOE in the mountains of hell remote combat group under the leadership of the former socialist Albrecht Gaiswinkler from Bad Aussee.
Both resistance groups appeared politically in the wake of the liberation by US troops in early May 1945 and participated in the rescue of the stolen art from all over Europe, which were stored in a tunnel of the salt mine in Aussee. These resistance fighters were also involved in the arrest of Nazi criminals like Ernst Kaltenbrunner.
Resistance in (state) enterprises:  (also a member of the catholic antifascist freedom movement )
Intelligence agency (Abwehr) resistance: Erwin von Lahousen He joined the resistance circle against Hitler within the 'defense'. It is believed that he kept his contact network with British, Czechoslovaks and Russian agents during the war.  Lahousen ordered that agents destined for Britain be trained primarily for spying, also with disastrous results. The case Lahausen is very controversial, there are different opinions. Various publications have been published that speak for him. 
Military resistance in the Wehrmacht: Robert Bernardis, Heinrich Kodré, group around Major Carl Szokoll (including Operation Walküre / Operation Valkyrie) Major Karl Biedermann, Hauptmann  and Oberleutnant  joined the resistance group of Austrian members of the Wehrmacht, led by Major Carl Szokoll, within the Wehrkreiskommando XVII. In the spring of 1945, this planned the "" whose goal was to assist the Red Army in the liberation of Vienna and to prevent major destruction. Biedermann should have occupied with his troops key positions in the city and to prevent the blowing up of bridges. But the planned for April 6, 1945 "" was betrayed. Robert Bernardis, Heinrich Kodré, Karl Biedermann, Alfred Huth and Rudolf Raschke were sentenced to death by the German "People's Court" (Volksgerichtshof) and executed the same day. In 1967 a barrack was named  "" (1140 Vienna, Penzing), in remembrance of these three Austrian officers of the German Wehrmacht Major Karl Biedermann, Captain Alfred Huth and Lieutenant Rudolf Raschke.

Catholic conservative bourgeois camp: 
 of Austria, the group 
 The CV (Cartellverband): an umbrella organization of catholic male student fraternities, which Maier and Caldonazzi also belonged. 
  
Already in autumn 1938, the Augustinian canon Roman Karl Scholz founded a resistance group together with his friend Viktor Reimann. On an earlier trip to England Scholz had been able to make political connections there. After the "Anschluss Österreichs" he sent regular reports on the situation in Austria and the activities of the resistance, which he had translated into English by his colleague Rüdiger Engerth. The networking of his resistance group spread from Vienna to Lower Austria (Mostviertel, areas around Baden), Upper Austria and Tyrol. In 1939, the Gestapo spy Otto Hartmann  joined the scene.. It is believed people around Roman Scholz were involved in Operation Anthropoid – the assassination of Reinhard Heydrich (see media). The Abbot of the Cistercian Monastery  died in 1941 in Anrath Prison. In or at the consequences of the detention died Lieutenant a. D. Richard Färber, Adolf Gubitzer, Heinrich Hock and Marie Schlagenhauser.
 as a group around Jacob Kastelic
"Östfrei" a monarchist resistance group around 
 The sermons of the Baptist  with frequently interspersed Nazi criticism

Legitimist resistance groups: During the Nazi era confessed legitimists were persecuted by the National Socialists, as they considered Otto von Habsburg as their rightful head of state and refused the German Reich's oath of allegiance. Approximately 4,500 legitimists and their loved ones were arrested and sent to concentration camps. Even during the Second World War, this group played a significant role in resistance and exile. On May 24, 1938, according to the State Commissioner, the following legitimistic associations were held as opposing organizations and associations with the Reich Governor in Vienna (Gen. Kdo XVII, Wehrkreiskdo. XVII, IC Az. 1p 12 No. 471/38): Eiserner Ring, Arbeitsgemeinschaft österreichischer Vereine, Akademischer Bund katholischer Österreichischer Landsmannschaften, Schwarzgoldenes Kartell, Altherrenbund „Raethe-Teutonia“, Vaterländische Wehrschaft „Ostmark“, Lichtensteinrunde, Vereinigung ehemaliger Theresianisten, Mitpatenschaft Wiener Frauen und Mädchen, Union bürgerlicher Kaufleute, Altkaiserjäger-Klub, Kameradschaft ehemaliger „7-er“, Verband ehemaliger Berufsoffiziere Österreichs, Vaterländischer Ring österreichischer Soldaten, Österreichisch-legitimistische Arbeitsgemeinschaft, Reichsbund der Österreicher, Österreichische Front, Schwarzgelbe Volkspartei, Österreichisches Donaurettungskorps, Österreichische Jugendbewegung „Ottonia“, Jungsturm „Ostmark“, Jung-österreichischer Bund, Vaterländischer Jugendverband Österreichs, Österreichischer Jungsturm, Bund der katholischen deutschen Jugend, Karl Vogelsang-Bund, „Die Habichtsburger“, Kaisertreue Volksbewegung, Legitimistischer Volksbund Österreich, Legitimistische Ärzteschaft Österreichs, Verband Altösterreich, Kaisertreuer Volksverband (Wolff-Verband)
 The group 
 the group Zemljak
 the group 
 the Illegale  (1938 forbidden, see also 
 the group around Otto von Habsburg 
 Other groups: "Jehovah's Witnesses"
Group 40: After WW II historians named and summarized resistance fighters "Group 40". Details follow link
Communist groups:
Communist Party of Austria (KPÖ), Communist Youth Association of Austria (KJVÖ), for example Leo Gabler, Anna Gräf, Rosa Hofmann, Hermann Langbein
 Independent communist groups such as: Trotskyist, Austrian fight bund for the liberation of the working class, the organization Against the Current (OG), the Mischlingsliga Wien (collection basin of "Mischlinge" in the sense of the Nuremberg Laws, initiated by Otto Horn and Otto Ernst Andreasch), by Karl Hudomalj founded anti-Hitler movement of Austria and the Revolutionary Communists of Austria (RKÖ)
Carinthia: Catholic, Slovenian, Socialist and Communist resistance fighters were arrested, tried or sent to concentration camps by the Gestapo. In three spectacular trials, 31 Slovenian members of the "Green Squad" and communist resistance fighters were sentenced to death and executed by Roland Freisler, President of the People's Court.
Civil servants: Marie Schönfeld, 
In exile: Austrian Democratic Union (August 1941 – 1945), London.
Silent heroes: for example: Gottfried von Einem, Ella Lingens

Formation

The movement had a prehistory of socialist and communist activism against the era of Austrofascism from 1934. Although the Austrofascist regime was itself intensely hostile to Nazism, especially after the Austrian Nazis' failed coup attempt in 1934, known as the July Putsch.

Notable activists included Josef Plieseis and Hilde Zimmermann.

The symbol and voice of Austrian resistance was Crown Prince Otto von Habsburg who, had the monarchy been reestablished, would have been Kaiser of Austria.

Activities

Much as opposing the Nazis was difficult, as maintaining organizational cohesion post the Anschluss constituted a penal offence, resistance activities were maintained throughout the period. The resistance mainly: issued counter-Nazi political leaflets; collected donations, which were mostly distributed to families of those arrested; and provided the Allies with information.

Military resistance was limited to occasional sabotage to both key civil and military installations, with most resisting by avoiding postings to the active war fronts.

Most armed resistance was undertaken in Carinthia. Carinthian Slovenes formed a nucleus to the resistance after targeted deportations and forced Germanisation by the Nazi regime in 1942 led to the establishment of forest bands. As much of the Slovene Lands in Yugoslavia had been annexed to the Reich in 1941 and were subject to the same tactics of ethnic cleansing in northern Slovenia the group's activities should be seen in the context of the Yugoslavian Slovene Partisan operations.

Habsburg opposition
 
Former Crown Prince Otto von Habsburg denounced Nazism, stating:

He strongly opposed the Anschluss, and in 1938 requested Austrian Chancellor Kurt Schuschnigg to resist Nazi Germany and supported an international intervention, and offered to return from exile to take over the reins of government in order to repel the Nazis. According to Gerald Warner, "Austrian Jews were among the strongest supporters of a Habsburg restoration, since they believed the dynasty would give the nation sufficient resolve to stand up to the Third Reich". Following the German annexation of Austria, Otto (who had been allowed to come back to Austria to publicly campaign against the Anschluss), was sentenced to death by the Nazi regime; Rudolf Hess ordered that Otto was to be executed immediately if caught, as ordered by Adolf Hitler. The leaders of the Austrian legitimist movement, i.e. supporters of Otto, were arrested by the Nazis and largely executed. Otto's cousins Maximilian, Duke of Hohenberg, and Prince Ernst of Hohenberg, both sons of the late Archduke Francis Ferdinand, whose assassination in 1914 precipitated World War I, were arrested in Vienna by the Gestapo and sent to Dachau where they remained throughout Nazi rule. Otto was involved in helping around 50,000 Austrians, including tens of thousands of Austrian Jews, flee the country at the beginning of the Second World War.

During his wartime exile in the United States, Otto and his younger brothers founded an "Austrian Battalion" in the United States Army, but it was delayed and never saw actual combat.

Religious group resistance

The organizational cohesion offence was most keenly felt by the Austrian religious community. The Nazis, via both the civil Gestapo and police, and the military Schutzstaffel (SS), implemented both anti-religious and anti-Austrian-patriotic measures. This brought about disparate resistance from many established religious groups, whose core members came mainly from the establishment of Austrian high society.

Catholic Church

Although tolerated to a large extent, noted anti-Catholic measures and regional imposition of such brought about the formation of three large regional Catholic-based resistance groups.

The first purge and arrest round occurred in Spring 1940, when the three groups had held talks on merging, in which over 100 activists were arrested, interrogated and some individuals tortured. After this, the leaders sought closer ties to the main body of the Austrian resistance movement, and although remaining separate in part for security reasons, began feeding both directly and indirectly information to the United States Military Intelligence Service (MIS).

Amongst the Catholic group's members were Burgtheater actor Otto Hartmann, a spy in paid service of the Gestapo. In late 1944, his information led to the arrest of 10 key Catholic resistance organisation leaders, who were all tortured and then sentenced to death. These included the main contacts with the American MIS, Semperit Director General Franz Josef Messner (1896-1945, killed in the gas chambers at the Mauthausen concentration camp), and Chaplain Dr. Heinrich Maier (1908-1945) executed on 22 March 1945 as the last victim of the Nazi régime in Vienna. Other detainees were sentenced to long prison terms, which some survived but many were killed before the final surrender.

The exile community in London

The main organised exile group during the Second World War was based around the Austrian Office in London, centre to the 30,000 strong exile community. The Austrian Society, or "Austrian Office", was home to both the monarchist Austrian League and liberal Austrian Democratic Union.

Battle of Castle Itter

The Austrian Resistance were involved in the Battle of Castle Itter, the Austrian village of Itter in the North Tyrol, was fought on 5 May 1945, only three days before Germany's unconditional surrender came into effect. Troops of the 23rd Tank Battalion of the US 12th Armored Division led by Lieutenant John C. "Jack" Lee, Jr., anti-Nazi German Army soldiers, and imprisoned French VIPs defended the castle against an attacking force from the 17th Waffen-SS Panzer Grenadier Division until relief from the American 142nd Infantry Regiment arrived.

Perspective

Austrian society has had an ambivalent attitude both toward the Nazi government from 1938 to 1945 and the few that actively resisted it.  Since large portions of Austrian society either actively or tacitly supported the Nazi regime, the Allied forces treated Austria as a belligerent party in the war and maintained occupation of it after the Nazi capitulation. On the other hand, the Moscow Declaration labeled Austria as a free and democratic society before the war, and considered its capture an act of liberation.

See also

 Documentation Centre of Austrian Resistance
 
 Victim List of CV
 Polish Underground State
 Austria under National Socialism#Austrian resistance
Media: https://www.youtube.com/watch?v=QV7YZjdjXhs (Resistance starts 1 h,31 min.)
Media ÖCV Resistance: https://www.youtube.com/watch?v=MnWpKV6tAsA

References

External links
 American Friends of the Documentation Center of Austrian Resistance
 Documentation Centre of Austrian Resistance (DÖW)
 European Resistance Archive (ERA) | video interviews with members of the resistance

 
Anti-fascism in Austria